Taufiq Ahmed may refer to the following people:

 a Pakistan Air Force cricketer in 1975/76
 an East Pakistan first-class cricketer in 1954